The 1961 National League was the 27th season and the sixteenth post-war season of the highest tier of motorcycle speedway in Great Britain.

Summary
The entry list was identical to the previous year and although Wimbledon Dons won their seventh title in eight years, it would be their last.

Final table

Top Ten Riders (League only)

National Trophy
The 1961 National Trophy was the 23rd edition of the Knockout Cup. Southampton were the winners.

First round

Second round

Semifinals

Final

First leg

Second leg

Southampton were National Trophy Champions, winning on aggregate 98–70.

See also
 List of United Kingdom Speedway League Champions
 Knockout Cup (speedway)

References

Speedway National League
1961 in speedway
1961 in British motorsport